World Cities Day is an annual United Nations observance day held on 31 October. The global observance, first held in 2014, is organized by the United Nations Human Settlements Programme (UN-Habitat) in coordination with each year's selected host city.

History

World Cities Day was established on 27 December 2013 by the United Nations General Assembly in its resolution A/RES/68/239, in which the General Assembly "decides to designate 31 October, beginning in 2014, as World Cities Day, invites States, the United Nations system, in particular UN-Habitat, relevant international organizations, civil society and all relevant stakeholders to observe and raise awareness of the Day". The first World Cities Day was held in October 2014.

A legacy of Expo 2010 Shanghai China, World Cities Day aims to promote the international community's interest in global urbanization, push forward cooperation among countries in meeting opportunities and addressing challenges of urbanization, and contributing to sustainable urban development around the world. The observance day ties in with Sustainable Development Goal 11, to make cities "inclusive, safe, resilient and sustainable".

The general theme of World Cities Day is Better City, Better Life, while each year a different sub-theme and a location for its global observance is selected, to either promote successes of urbanization, or address specific challenges resulting from urbanization.

Previous World Cities Days

References

External links
World Cities Day, UN-Habitat

Human habitats
United Nations days
October observances
Holidays and observances by scheduling (nth weekday of the month)
Human settlement
United Nations Human Settlements Programme